Malcolm Arthur Hahn  (3 May 1931 – 2 April 2010) was a New Zealand athlete and javelin thrower.

At the 1958 British Empire and Commonwealth Games in Cardiff, Wales he was the New Zealand flagbearer at the opening ceremony. In the javelin competition he finished 13th with a throw of 204’ 9½” (62.42 m).

Malcolm Arthur Hahn ( 1931 - 2010 ) was the great great grandson of Ludwig Johan Hahn (1820 - 1899) Born in Memel, Lithuania.

References 

New Zealand male javelin throwers
Commonwealth Games competitors for New Zealand
Athletes (track and field) at the 1958 British Empire and Commonwealth Games
2010 deaths
1931 births
Recipients of the Queen's Service Medal